Edgar Howard Wright (born 18 April 1974) is an English filmmaker. He is known for his fast-paced and kinetic, satirical genre films, which feature extensive utilisation of expressive popular music, Steadicam tracking shots, dolly zooms and a signature editing style that includes transitions, whip pans and wipes. He began making independent short films before making his first feature film A Fistful of Fingers  in 1995. Wright created and directed the comedy series Asylum in 1996, written with David Walliams. After directing several other television shows, Wright directed the sitcom Spaced (1999–2001), which aired for two series  and starred frequent collaborators Simon Pegg and Nick Frost.

In 2004, Wright directed the zombie comedy Shaun of the Dead, starring Pegg and Frost, the first film in Wright's Three Flavours Cornetto trilogy. The film was co-written with Pegg—as were the next two entries in the trilogy, the buddy cop film Hot Fuzz (2007) and the science fiction comedy The World's End (2013). In 2010, Wright co-wrote and directed the action comedy film Scott Pilgrim vs. the World, an adaptation of the graphic novel series. Along with Joe Cornish and Steven Moffat, he adapted The Adventures of Tintin (2011) for Steven Spielberg. Wright and Cornish co-wrote the screenplay for the Marvel Cinematic Universe film Ant-Man in 2015, which Wright intended to direct but abandoned, citing creative differences. He has also directed the action film Baby Driver (2017), and recently the documentary The Sparks Brothers (2021), as well as the psychological horror film Last Night in Soho (2021).

Early life and education 
Edgar Howard Wright was born on 18 April 1974 in Poole, Dorset and grew up predominantly in Wells in Somerset. He has an older brother, Oscar, who is an artist. He attended The Blue School, Wells from 1985 to 1992, and is honoured by a plaque at the school. His school drama teacher, Peter Wild, later played a cameo role in Hot Fuzz. 

At the age of 12, Wright took a girl to the 1987 film Mannequin, but failed to kiss her due to the presence of a group of boys. This led to the demise of their romance, and the heartbreak Wright experienced would be instrumental in his career.

Throughout the late 1980s and early 1990s, he directed many short films, first on a Super-8 camera that was a gift from a family member and later on a Video-8 camcorder that he won in a competition on the television-program Going Live. These films were mostly comedic pastiches of popular genres, such as the super hero-inspired Carbolic Soap and Dirty Harry tribute Dead Right (which was featured on the DVD release of Hot Fuzz). 

From 1992 to 1994, Wright attended the Bournemouth and Poole College of Art and Design (now Arts University Bournemouth) and received an ND in Audio-Visual Design. 

In June 2018, Arts University Bournemouth awarded Wright an Honorary Fellowship. On receiving the award Wright said that he still thought very fondly of his time there.

Career

1995–2002: Early works and Spaced
Wright made his feature film debut in 1995 with a low budget, independent spoof western, A Fistful of Fingers, which was picked up for a limited theatrical release and broadcast on the satellite TV channel Sky Movies. Despite Wright's dissatisfaction with the finished product, it caught the attention of comedians Matt Lucas and David Walliams, who subsequently chose him as the director of their Paramount Comedy channel production Mash and Peas. During this time he also worked on BBC-programs such as Is It Bill Bailey?, Alexei Sayle's Merry-Go-Round and Sir Bernard's Stately Homes. In an interview with journalist and author Robert K. Elder for The Film That Changed My Life, Wright attributes his edgy and comedic style to his love for An American Werewolf in London.

I've always been fascinated by horror films and genre films. And horror films harbored a fascination for me and always have been something I've wanted to watch and wanted to make. Equally, I'm very fascinated by comedy. I suppose the reason that this film changed my life is that very early on in my film-watching experiences, I saw a film that was so sophisticated in its tone and what it managed to achieve.

In 1998 writer/actors Simon Pegg and Jessica Hynes were in the early stages of developing their sitcom Spaced for Channel 4 and thought of asking Wright to direct, having fondly remembered working with him on the 1996 Paramount comedy Asylum. Wright gave Spaced an unusual look for the sitcom genre, with dramatic camera angles and movement borrowed from the visual language of science fiction and horror films. Instead of shying away from these influences Wright makes an active effort to show his referencing, adding a 'Homage-O-Meter' to all of his releases, a device that displays each directorial nod he has made during shooting. In 2002, he made appearances as a scientist and a technician named Eddie Yorque during both series of Look Around You, a BBC-program created by a member of the Spaced cast, Peter Serafinowicz. He also made two brief appearances in Spaced, one in which he can be seen, along with other crew members on the series, lying asleep in Daisy Steiner's squat as she prepares to leave for her new house. The other is a brief appearance during the montage in the episode "Gone" where Daisy describes to Tim what she thinks would be a fun night out for the two. Edgar is sitting on the tube (with a beard) next to Tim and Daisy.

2003–2013: The Three-Flavours-Cornetto-trilogy and Scott Pilgrim

The critical success of Spaced paved the way for Wright and Pegg to move to the big screen with Shaun of the Dead, a zombie comedy which mixed a "Brit flick" romantic comedy style with homages to the horror classics of George A. Romero and Sam Raimi. The film was a success critically and financially, and its rooting in American genre cinema helped to make it an international hit.

The pair subsequently planned out a trilogy of British genre-comedies which were connected not by narrative but by their shared traits and motifs. The trilogy was named "The Three-Flavours-Cornetto-Trilogy" by the pair due to a running joke about the British ice cream product Cornetto and its effectiveness as a hangover cure. Wright explained to Clark Collis in an interview for Entertainment Weekly, "We put that joke in Shaun of the Dead where Nick asks for a Cornetto first thing in the morning. When I was at college, it was my hangover cure—probably still is my hangover cure. Then we put it into Hot Fuzz because we thought it would be a funny recurring thing. One journalist in the United Kingdom said, 'Is this going to be your theme as a trilogy?' and I said, 'Yes, it's like Krzysztof Kieślowski's Three Colours trilogy. This is the Three Flavours Cornetto trilogy.' It was just a joke that stuck." Collis observes that the films also feature "a running gag involving garden fences."

The second instalment was the comedy action thriller Hot Fuzz. Production started in March 2006 and the film was released in February 2007 in the United Kingdom and April 2007 in the United States. It revolves around Pegg's character, Nicholas Angel, a police officer who is transferred from London to rural Sandford, where grisly events soon take place.

In 2007, Wright also directed a fake trailer insert for Quentin Tarantino and Robert Rodriguez's Grindhouse, called "Don't". It was a plotless trailer that mocked horror clichés, with lines such as, "If you... are thinking... of going ... into... this... house... DON'T!".

In 2010, Scott Pilgrim vs. the World was released; its over-$85 million budget dwarfed the £8 million budget of Hot Fuzz. The film, based on the graphic novel series Scott Pilgrim, was co-written, co-produced and directed by Wright. It took in roughly half its budget in box office, in spite of its critical reception and praise from fellow directors such as Kevin Smith, Quentin Tarantino and Jason Reitman.

In November 2011, The Adventures of Tintin, directed by Steven Spielberg, produced by Peter Jackson, and based on Hergé's The Adventures of Tintin was released. Wright co-wrote the film with writing partner Joe Cornish and Steven Moffat. The film also co-starred Wright's frequent collaborators Simon Pegg and Nick Frost.

The third instalment of the trilogy, The World's End, premiered in London on 10 July 2013. The film is about several friends who reunite when one decides to repeat a pub crawl they did 20 years earlier. They have to get to The World's End pub without ending up in the gutter to do this, but some unusual powers are at work and what happens to them may determine what happens to humans as a species.

2014–2017: Ant-Man and Baby Driver 
Wright was developing a live-action film based on the Marvel Comics superhero Ant-Man with Joe Cornish since 2006. However, on 23 May 2014, Wright and Marvel Studios issued a joint statement announcing that Wright would exit the movie due to creative differences. According to Wright, he had been hired as writer-director but became unhappy when Marvel wanted to write a new script. In 2017, he said: "The most diplomatic answer is I wanted to make a Marvel movie but I don't think they really wanted to make an Edgar Wright movie ... having written all my other movies, that's a tough thing to move forward. Suddenly becoming a director for hire on it, you’re sort of less emotionally invested and you start to wonder why you’re there, really." He was replaced by Peyton Reed as director, with Adam McKay and star Paul Rudd rewriting the screenplay. He and Cornish received both screenplay and story credits, with Wright also credited as executive producer.

In July 2014, Wright announced that his next film would be Baby Driver. Wright has described the film as "kind of like a musical", and Deadline Hollywood described it as "a collision of crime, action, music, and sound". The film stars Ansel Elgort, Kevin Spacey, Lily James, Eiza González, Jon Hamm, and Jamie Foxx. The film began production on 11 February 2016 in Atlanta, and was released on 28 June 2017.

2018–present: The Sparks-Brothers and Last Night in Soho 
In June 2018, Edgar announced he would be making a documentary on the cult pop rock band Sparks. He had covered the band's concert in London in May at the O2 Forum Kentish Town. This concert would be included in the documentary. The film had its world premiere at the 2021 Sundance Film Festival on 30 January 2021 and was theatrically released in North America on 18 June 2021, by Focus Features.

In January 2019, it was announced that his next film will be a horror thriller film set in London and inspired by films such as Don't Look Now and Repulsion. In February 2019, it was revealed that the title was Last Night in Soho, with Anya Taylor-Joy attached to star. In February, Matt Smith and Thomasin McKenzie joined the cast. Other confirmed crew members include co-screenwriter Krysty Wilson-Cairns, editor Paul Machliss (who edited four episodes of Spaced in 2001 and all of Wright's films since Scott Pilgrim vs. the World) and Baby Driver production designer Marcus Rowland. The film was scheduled to be released on 25 September 2020 but was pushed back to 29 October 2021 owing to the COVID-19 pandemic.

Upcoming projects
In November 2015, it was announced that Wright would direct and co-write with David Walliams a DreamWorks Animation film centred on "the concept of shadows", that has been in development since 2010. Shadows, as the film was known, was to be Wright's animation directorial debut. The film has been in development for a long time, changing directors. Mark Dindal, who created the film's original story, was involved between 2010 and 2012, was replaced by Alessandro Carloni from 2012 to 2015, and Wright is slated to develop the film. Three drafts of script were written but the project is on hold due to staff changes at DreamWorks.

In March 2020, it was announced that Wright would be directing an adaptation of the book Set My Heart To Five by Simon Stephenson, who will be also writing the screenplay. The film follows an android dentist named Jared in the year 2054, as he undergoes an emotional awakening after he is introduced to the world of 80s and 90s movies. The film is also set to be produced by Working Title Films and Focus Features.

On 19 May 2020 it was announced that Wright has formed a production company with longtime collaborators Nira Park, Joe Cornish and Rachel Prior called Complete Fiction. That same day, it was reported that the production company had inked a deal with Netflix to tackle adaptations of Lockwood & Co., The Murders of Molly Southbourne, and The City of Brass. The production company is also set to produce another Netflix original series, albeit one that is under wraps and has several feature films in development with Working Title Films.

In June 2020, Deadline Hollywood reported that Wright would direct an adaptation of the 2019 novel The Chain by Adrian McKinty for Universal Pictures, with the screenplay written by Jane Goldman.

On 19 February 2021, Wright signed on to direct Paramount Pictures' new film adaptation of Stephen King's The Running Man, which will also be a remake of the 1987 film version. Wright and Michael Bacall will re-imagine the story for a new audience, with the latter writing the screenplay.

Other potential projects that Wright has developed include an expansion of his "Don't" fake trailer, adaptations of the TV series The Night Stalker, the book Grasshopper Jungle and the book Fortunately, the Milk, as well as a sequel to Baby Driver.

Recurring cast-members

Personal life

Wright has stated in The Film That Changed My Life that the film that most influenced him was John Landis's An American Werewolf in London. Wright also mentioned Sam Raimi's Evil Dead II and the Coen brothers' Raising Arizona as films that made him want to be a director. When he met Raimi and told him so, Raimi joked to him, "Don't say that, you make me feel old."

In December 2007, Wright began guest programming at Repertory theatre the New Beverly Cinema following a sold-out screening of his films. He curated a two-week series of his favourite films dubbed "The Wright Stuff", hosting interviews with filmmakers and performers for each screening. The festival concluded with a double-bill of Evil Dead II and Raising Arizona. Wright returned for additional "The Wright Stuff" events in January 2011 and December 2011, the third series consisting of films Wright had been recommended by friends Bill Hader, Daniel Waters, Quentin Tarantino, Judd Apatow, Joss Whedon, John Landis and Joe Dante, but had never seen before. Wright's attempt to narrow the list based on public comment from visitors to his blog "produced another thousand suggestions." In August 2013, Wright programmed an additional double-feature series at the theater, "The World's End is Nigh", consisting of 12 movies that he called "stepping stones to our new movie" The World's End.

Wright is a friend of fellow director Garth Jennings, and has made cameos in all of Jennings' films. Jennings himself had cameos in Shaun of the Dead, Hot Fuzz and The World's End.

Filmography

Film

Executive producer only
 Attack the Block (2011)
 Sightseers (2012)

Acting credits

Short films

Television

Acting roles

Music videos

Video games

Advertisments

Awards and nominations

References

External links

 
 
 
 
 The Director Interviews: Edgar Wright, Hot Fuzz  at Filmmaker Magazine
 2004 interview with 2000ADReview
 Edgar Wright on Hot Fuzz

1974 births
Living people
21st-century English writers
English film directors
English screenwriters
English male screenwriters
English male television actors
English television directors
Horror film directors
People from Poole
People from Wells, Somerset
Action film directors
Science fiction film directors
Alumni of Arts University Bournemouth
21st-century British screenwriters
21st-century English male writers
Postmodernist filmmakers